Fire-Eater is a 1998 Finnish film directed and written by Pirjo Honkasalo. It tells a story of two orphaned sisters who end up working in a travelling circus. The film received several international awards, including the Grand Jury prize at the American Film Institute International Film Festival in 1998.

Main cast 

Elina Hurme as Helena Sulander
Tiina Weckström as Sirkka Sulander
Elena Leeve as Helena as a teenager 
Elsa Saisio as Irene Sulander as a teenager
Vappu Jurkka as Grandmother
Jordi Borrell as Ramon

References

External links
ELONET – Tulennielijä

Finnish drama films
1998 films
Films directed by Pirjo Honkasalo
Films scored by Richard Einhorn
Circus films
1990s Finnish-language films